Jimmy Vivino (born January 10, 1955) is an American guitarist, keyboard player, singer, producer, and music director. He is best known as having been the leader of Jimmy Vivino and the Basic Cable Band, the house band for the TBS late night program Conan. He was also a member of The Tonight Show Band, the house band on The Tonight Show with Conan O'Brien and its predecessor, Late Night with Conan O'Brien on NBC. Vivino has also played with many rock bands, including being a member of Beatles tribute band The Fab Faux. He is the younger brother of actor Floyd Vivino and Basic Cable Band bandmate Jerry Vivino.

Biography
Born in Paterson, New Jersey, on January 10, 1955, Vivino grew up in Glen Rock, New Jersey.  He attended Glen Rock High School where he played Tevye in a production of Fiddler on the Roof.  He had an interest in music from a young age. He began working in New York clubs in the early 1980s and in 1984 was musical director of the play Leader of the Pack. Later he led "Jimmy Vivino and the Black Italians" and worked with Al Kooper. Kooper considered Vivino to be one of his "discoveries" and had him as musical director for fifteen years.

Vivino served as the music director on the TBS late-night program Conan.  Vivino was a consistent element in O'Brien's late night career, starting with the first episode of Late Night with Conan O'Brien in September 1993.  In June 2008, Vivino moved from New York to Los Angeles and worked as music director/guitarist/arranger on The Tonight Show with Conan O'Brien, The Legally Prohibited from Being Funny on Television Tour, and until 2018, lead Jimmy Vivino and the Basic Cable Band on Conan.

Vivino divides his time between recording sessions and live gigs throughout the country.  In addition to his solo work, Vivino plays with the successful Beatles tribute band The Fab Faux. Vivino has also recorded and played live with such legends as Johnnie Johnson, Hubert Sumlin, Levon Helm, and Al Kooper.  Earlier in his career, Vivino got his start producing, playing, and arranging for such artists as Phoebe Snow, Laura Nyro, John Sebastian, and Donald Fagen.

Partial discography
 Novemberin''' - Shuggie Otis (Guitar) (2008)
 Live at Lucilles – Michael Packer Blues Band (Guitar) (2007)
 Live at Sweet Rhythm – Michael Packer Blues Band (Guitar) (2007)
 Mule-A-Go-Go – New Year's Eve 2005–2006 (Special Guest) (2006)
 Alone Together (2005)
 Steaks & Chops: Live at Great Jones, Volume 1 (Guitar) (2005)
 Blues in the Blood  - Big Bill Morganfield (Guitar, Mandolin, Organ, Piano, Producer) (2003)
 Best of M.C. Records 1996–2002 (Guitar) (2003)
 Remedy (Vocals) (2002)
 Different Shade of Red: The Woodstock Sessions – Louisiana Red (Organ, Guitar, Mandolin, Director, Producer, Horn Arrangement) (2002)
 Crazy Kind of Life – Bill Perry (Organ, Guitar, Piano, Vocals, Producer) (2002)
 Respond, Volume II (Guitar) (2002)
 Live at Manny's Car Wash - Rhett Tyler (Guitar) (2001)
 Rare & Well Done: The Greatest and the Most Obscure Recordings – Al Kooper (position?) (2001)
 No Small Wonder – Liz Quelar (Electric Guitar) (2001)
 Fire It Up – Bill Perry (2001) (Co-producer/Guest Instrumentalist)
 Do What, Now? (1997) 
 Chitlins Parmigiana  - The Vivino Brothers (Guitar/Composer) (1992)
 Laura: Live at the Bottom Line – Laura Nyro (Guitar/Mandolin/Vocals/Co-producer) (1989)

Filmography

Crew
 The Green Room with Jimmy Vivino (2022) (Host)
 Messengers (2004) (Music Producer)
 Late Night with Conan O'Brien: 10th Anniversary Special Television (2003) (Co-musical Director/Music Arranger/Musician: house band)
 The First Wives Club (1996) (Orchestrator)
 Stuart Saves His Family (1995) (Additional Orchestrator)
 Boys on the Side (1995) (Production Music Producer)
 Sister Act 2: Back in the Habit (1993) (Assistant Music Supervisor)
 Late Night with Conan O'Brien TV series (1993)  (Assistant Musical Director)
 Sister Act (1992) (Music Coordinator/Orchestrator: score)
 Legendary Ladies of Rock & Roll Television (1988)  (musical director)

Composer50 Years of NBC Late Night (2001)

HimselfConanThe Tonight Show with Conan O'BrienLate Night with Conan O'BrienLate Night with Conan O'Brien: 10th Anniversary Special (2003)Comic Relief VIII (1998)Déjà View: The Cinemax Session With James Brown, Aretha Franklin and Wilson PickettLegendary Ladies of Rock and RollThe Uncle Floyd Show'' ("Uncle" Floyd Vivino - Jimmy Vivino's older brother)
Team COCO

See also
 Late Night with Conan O'Brien
 Jimmy Vivino and the Basic Cable Band
 The Tonight Show with Conan O'Brien
 Conan
  Blind Pig Records

References

External links
 jimmyvivino.com
 The Max Weinberg 7 - bio on NBC.com
 
 discography at jimmyvivino.com
 
 {http://www.vivinomusic.com/#}
 Radio interview
Jimmy Vivino Interview NAMM Oral History Library (2014)

1955 births
American male singers
Musicians from Paterson, New Jersey
The Max Weinberg 7 members
Living people
Jersey Shore musicians
Singers from New Jersey
Glen Rock High School alumni
People from Glen Rock, New Jersey
American people of Italian descent
The Tonight Show Band members
Guitarists from New Jersey
American male guitarists
20th-century American guitarists
Jimmy Vivino and the Basic Cable Band members